Vinogradovka is a rural locality (a selo) in Kursky Selsoviet, Kulundinsky District, Altai Krai, Russia. The population was 236 in 2013. There are three streets.

Geography 
Vinogradovka is located 20 km southeast of Kulunda (the district's administrative centre) by road. Mirny is the nearest rural locality.

References 

Rural localities in Kulundinsky District